No. 5 the Film (2004) is a 180-second short film directed by Baz Luhrmann (Romeo + Juliet, Moulin Rouge!) and starring Nicole Kidman and Rodrigo Santoro. Karl Lagerfeld designed the costumes; he also briefly appears in the film. It is part of a new breed of advertising crossover films known as branded content. It had a budget of US$33 million, financed exclusively by Chanel. Visually captivating, the film is an extended television commercial for Chanel No. 5 perfume. The film was initially screened in many North American cinemas during the "Coming Attractions" section preceding the main feature. During the 2006 Christmas season, an edited 30-second TV spot was shown on primetime on many networks in Canada and the United States. Kidman was paid $3 million for her role in the advertisement.

Runtime
The original version after preliminary editing came to around 360 seconds, but this was later edited to a more manageable 180 seconds, including 60 seconds of credits, for television broadcast and cinema advertisement. Further cutting has led to subsequent 90-second (as seen in the UK) and 30-second (seen mostly in the U.S. and Canada) versions of the advert, shown after the first runs of the advert.

Plot
A famous celebrity (Nicole Kidman) runs away in a pink dress in the middle of Times Square in New York City, only to get into a cab with the one man who does not know who she is, a plot line similar to Roman Holiday. After four days in his Lower East Side apartment, her secretary (Lagerfeld) commands her to return to her life as a celebrity. The paparazzi take pictures of her as she walks up stairs, and she looks at big letters, a graphical device often used in Luhrmann's Red Curtain Trilogy, on top of a building that read "Coco Chanel" with her lover standing next to them. They smile at each other and then the credits are shown.

Music
The main musical theme of the film is Claude Debussy's "Clair de lune", arranged by Craig Armstrong and performed by the Sydney Symphony Orchestra.

Sequel
In 2014 Baz Luhrmann created a sequel film titled Chanel No. 5: The One That I Want. The film stars model Gisele Bündchen and actor Michiel Huisman.

References

External links
 
 
 

2004 short films
2004 films
Sponsored films
Promotional films
Films directed by Baz Luhrmann
Chanel
2000s English-language films
American short films